Allanthalia is a genus of hybotid dance flies in the family Hybotidae. There is at least one described species in Allanthalia, A. pallida.

Species
A. pallida (Zetterstedt, 1838)

References

Hybotidae
Articles created by Qbugbot
Empidoidea genera